Mohammed Chhel originally a fakir (mystic) was a renowned magician of Saurashtra, Gujarat. Mohammed Chhel was born in 1850 in Ningala, a small village and a railway junction in Gadhada Taluka of Bhavnagar district in Saurashtra, Gujarat (India). Basically he was a Pir of a known Dargah and was involved in benevolent works the entirety of his life. Said to have been blessed with supernatural powers, Mohammed Chhel eventually turned magician but his character and nobility were those of a mystic. The message of life he wished to convey to people was that of himself serving society and helping the needy with his magnetic aura and miraculous acts, flavored by his sense of humor.
Mohammed Chhel had a definite sense and sensibility, a fine sense of humor and rare message of life to convey, all which mainly addressed people who were hardworking, honest, innocent villagers, peasants, countrymen and mass belonging to towns and countryside. Chhel became earnestly popular among train passengers as he frequently used to travel by train between countryside of Saurashtra and Gujarat. And eventually, his magic and acts became evident across Rail trips. People would unfailingly encounter an experience of Mohammed Chhel's magic and miracles if they were traveling by train and if their luck to strike to come across Mohammed Chhel in the train or at the railway station.

Ningala, yet a small town, still a railway junction became instrumental and medium for his train encounters earned him lasting fame. Due to his extraordinary persona and god gifted powers, Mohammed Chhel occupied a distinct place other than the conventional and contemporary magicians, and successful tricksters may have in people's minds. He knowingly or unknowingly served as Psychiatrist and a respected mystic to be remembered for. Reason is it was more his healing than obvious amusement, shocking surprises, miracles and entertainment his acts provided.

Popular incidents of Mohammed Chhel

There are plenty of his acts, miracles and occasions which people still remember through their ancestors and in form of stories from locals. A few incidents such as, he could make a train ticket checker shocked by producing avalanche of tickets out of his chin! His unbelievable acts a number of times for he had decoupled a running train with only engine chugging away! Among the locals in the Gujarat, Saurashtra and Bhavnagar region, there are people whose ancestors have remained eye-witness of this act!

Moneylender stuck and unstuck
One more incident, once a poor villager was in clutches of a moneylender after the peasant borrowed some money from the moneylender. Chhel freed the villager from the clutches of moneylender by casting a spell that did not allow him to get out of his own chair! The moneylender realized and confessed for his falsified account on the name of the peasant. He wrote off those debts and then Chhel let the moneylender go unstuck!

Merchant's ailing wife
Another well known case, once a troubled merchant wanted to know about his ailing wife in Mumbai and it was not common to have telephones those days. Especially, telephone facility was rare in rural areas. The worried local merchant came to Mohammed Chhel, knowing his miracles and powers. Chhel put his palm across the merchant's eyes and asked him if he could see his wife. The gentleman was amused and relieved to see his wife working in the kitchen, hale and hearty. Later the news of her well-being reached him, confirming the powers of Mohammed Chhel.

If not sweets, beware of Cobra
A sweet and cobra incident/story is also popular among the people. Once during a train ride, a rich man sitting across Mohammed Chhel held a basket of sweets in his lap. Occasionally he looked around and popped a sweet into his mouth when nobody was looking. Chhel requested the man to share his goodies with fellow passengers who happened to be poor folk. But the man did not pay any heed to this. At this, Chhel told him to be careful when he picked up another round of sweets from his basket. Ignoring the warning, the man dipped his hand once moreinto the basket and pulled out a hissing cobra instead of a sweet!

Sir Sultan Mahomed Shah Aga Khan's Staff
On December 20, 1893 Chhel came to Junagadh to meet Sir Sultan Mohamed Shah Aga Khan at a fairground outside Manjevdi, hoping to dazzle the Imam with his magical powers. 
Chhel approached the Imam’s entourage and Varas Kasam Bapoo asked what is it?
Chhel asked: I’d like to meet Aga Sahib, “Main hoon jadoo Ghar Mohammed Chhel, jiska agam nigamka khel, ghee ka banaau tel, aur bhe(n)s ko banaadu bel!”
Imam Sir Sultan Mohamed Shah appeared and asked, kya chaahiye toomko? (what do you want?)

Chhel replied: Kuch nahi chaahihe, Janaab, kuchh nahin, mein to sirf mere jadoo ka parchha dikhaana chaahta hoon, Main hoon jadoo ghar Mohammed Chhel, jiska agam nigam ka khel
(nothing Sir, nothing -- I just wish to show You my magic. I am Mohammed Chhel, he who defies logic!)
Sir Sultan Mahomed Shah Happily said: Yes, very good, but I am a dervish, I have no interest in so-called magic
The Imam then instructed Varas Kassam Bapoo to give Chhel Rs. 200
Chhel did not accept it saying: no no Sahib, I just ask for Your blessings.
The Imam asked if he wanted anything further, to that Chhel replied: I just wish to show you my magical powers -- I can penetrate a hammer in to my chest, I can make all the marine life and crustations abandon the sea, I can turn the seawater into wax, I can swallow a flame, - - Sahib, I am Jadoo Ghar Mohammed Chhel!
Aga Khan: okay, okay, what trick will you show me?
Chhel: Aga Sahib, if I simply exhale, I can make this entire marquee fly away and disappear, or if I clap my hands, this entire mela (fairground) will disappear and the ground will become baren. Yes Sahib, Yes… no one as enchanting as me has ever been born in this universe, 
Chhel continued to give a long lecture, saying what was to be said, but also saying what was not to be said. Chhel ended by saying, Aga Sahib, give me the command (hukam) of what you wish to see, and I will perform magic. 
At that time, Sir Sultan Mahomed Shah let go of his staff and it fell to the ground, saying: okay, show me all the tricks you wish to; but first pick up my staff. Show me the magic of picking up this staff, pick it up and place it in my hand. 
Chhel: O Sahib, what is such a big deal about this task? This can be done simply by me hovering my left hand. 
Aga Khan: O really? Please pick up my staff, use both hands if you need to.
Chell began reciting mantras and waving his hands, blowing vigorously, clapping, moving his fingers in choreographed motions – the staff would not move. 
When Chhel tried to lift it with his hands, using all his strength, dripping with perspiration, breathing heavily, he fell sideways, but the staff did not move, 
The scene was reminiscent of the staff of Moses and that of the Pharaoh. Indeed Sir Sultan Mahomed Shah Aga Khan traces his ancestry back to Moses Himself. 
Chhel was totally confused and was turning red with grief!
Sir Sultan Mohammed Shah found great amusement in witnessing this, to his right was Varas Kassam Bapoo, to his left was Kul Kamadia Ibrahim Bhai, both of whom were astonished that this world-renowned magician could not even pick up a stick from the floor!
Chhel fell to the Imams feet and begged “O Aga, O Pir Sahib, forgive me!” the Imam replied, I never tried to challenge you, I am a dervish, I do not take interest in such nonsense. He continued by saying, Mohammed Chhel, why did you give up? This is such a simple task that even a child can do.
In the distance there was an 8 or 9 year old boy who was seen playing, the Imam loved this child dearly, Sir Sultan Mahomed Shah requested: “Beta, can you pick up my staff and hand it to Me?” right away this child picked up the staff with one hand, he wiped it clean and handed it to his Imam. 
Sir Sultan Mahomed Shah said to Chhel: see this is a task for a young child – but remember, I am the Imam, and without the blessing and blessing and command of God, nothing can be achieved in this world.

Mischief, superiors and experiences
Mohammed Chhel, because of his tricks, some times for his spontaneous acts and due to his fame, unknowingly made people cautious and at times made them frightened too. Although, his acts were purely for fun, entertainment and some message, he would not hesitate going extravagant at times. His mischievous stance and fame, while earned him reputation and admiration, it also questioned him for a few times. For example, a famous Jain Muni Shri Vijaynemisuriji Maharaj, to teach Chhel not to harass Sadhus and Saints, knowingly or otherwise if he would ever come across them. One more incidence is of one Ismaili Imam Saheb who would make Mohammed Chhel wonder-struck in response to Chhel's proposal for showing his own magic acts.

Mission and message
Mohammed Chhel attained, although he was already one, the honorable title of 'Pir', meaning a mystique, a fakir. He is often remembered as Pir Mohammed Chhel among the people, across the region and in the provinces of Saurashtra and Gujarat. Mohammed Chhel, became a name of reputation and respect in magician fraternity in Gujarat and India. Defying the routine 'magician' term, Chhel's contribution was more than that of a magician. He would strive and spontaneously extend by his acts and tricks for the benefit of fellows and countrymen.

Exact date of Mohammed Chhel's death is not known, albeit he died in 1925. Some still term a few incidents as stories that have been flowing for over a century with all authentic details and proof remaining verifiable, and many still who shared their eye-witness accounts among locals and in their families happen to attest, those were true. Reason could be those miracles and acts attained the rank of stories because Mohammed Chhel and his real mystic - magical acts got woven in people heart and memory over the years and over the generations.

See also
 Indian Magicians
 Magician (paranormal)
 Magician (illusion)
 Mysticism

External links
  Story of Mohammed Chhel by Tara Bose
  The Disappearing Trick
  The Street Juggler
  Mohammed Chhel: The people's magician

References

1850 births
1925 deaths
Indian magicians
People from Gujarat
People from Bhavnagar district